Andreas Blomqvist is a heavy metal bassist from Stockholm, Sweden, best known for his role as the bassist and founding member of progressive metal band Seventh Wonder.
Andreas formed Seventh Wonder alongside guitarist Johan Liefvendahl and drummer Johnny Sandin after their previous band fell apart.  The music turned towards the side of progressive metal, and as the band was joined by keyboard player Andreas "Kyrt" Söderin late 2000, the new sound was cemented further.  Two demos were recorded over the next few years (Seventh Wonder in 2001 and Temple in the Storm in 2003) and both received good press.

In 2005, Seventh Wonder released their first full-length studio album, Become.  It was followed in 2006 by Waiting in the Wings.  In 2008, they released the critically acclaimed concept album Mercy Falls.  They followed this with the very successful The Great Escape, which was released in 2010. Their most recent studio album is Tiara, released in 2018.

Blomqvist's playing style frequently incorporates techniques such as fretboard tapping and sections of fast arpeggios, such as his bass solo in Walking Tall from Waiting in the Wings. He primarily uses a 6-string Bass Guitar for recording and live performances.  On the song Long Way Home from  The Great Escape, he played a fretless bass. He has listed Marcel Jacob (Talisman, Yngwie Malmsteen) and Thomas Miller (ex Symphony X) as his most important influences.

Blomqvist also does the majority of Seventh Wonder's interviews, writes much of the music and appears to have been the driving force in the band. Blomqvist also acts as the band's lyricist together with singer Tommy Karevik.

Discography
Seventh Wonder (2001)
Temple in the Storm (2003)
Become (2005)
Waiting in the Wings (2006)
Mercy Falls (2008)
 The Great Escape (2010)
Welcome To Atlanta Live 2014 (2016)
Tiara (2018)
The Testament (2022)

External links
https://web.archive.org/web/20090830072229/http://www.seventhwonder.nu/
http://www.andreasblomqvist.com
http://www.myspace.com/officialsw
http://www.myspace.com/andreasblomqvist
http://www.careligo.se/

1978 births
Living people
Swedish bass guitarists
Seventh Wonder members
21st-century bass guitarists